Jamarro Diks (born 26 June 1995) is a Dutch footballer who plays as a winger for Excelsior '31. His family is Indonesian of Moluccan descent.

Club career

AS Trenčín

Diks started his career with AS Trenčín in Slovakia.

Diks made his professional Fortuna Liga debut for AS Trenčín against Senica on 23 July 2016. In January 2017, Diks returned to Holland to play for amateur side GVVV, but was released by GVVV at the end of the season.

Personal life
Diks is the older brother of professional footballer Kevin.

References

External links
 AS Trenčín official club profile
 Futbalnet profile
 

1995 births
Living people
Sportspeople from Apeldoorn
Dutch people of Indonesian descent
Dutch people of Moluccan descent
Dutch footballers
Association football forwards
AS Trenčín players
GVVV players
Tweede Divisie players
CSV Apeldoorn players
Vierde Divisie players
Excelsior '31 players
Derde Divisie players
Slovak Super Liga players
Dutch expatriate footballers
Expatriate footballers in Slovakia
Dutch expatriate sportspeople in Slovakia
AGOVV Apeldoorn players
SBV Vitesse players
Footballers from Gelderland